β-Tocotrienol is a tocotrienol, a member of vitamin E family.

References

Vitamin E